Aloestrela is a genus of flowering plants belonging to the family Asphodelaceae. This genus is named in honour of Professor Dr Estrela Figueiredo of the Department of Botany of the Nelson Mandela University. It contains the sole species Aloestrela suzannae  (synonym Aloe suzannae ), endemic to Madagascar.

References

Asphodelaceae
Monotypic Asphodelaceae genera
Endemic flora of Madagascar